Urho Albinus Kulovaara (1 March 1889 – 15 June 1964) was a Finnish schoolteacher and politician, born in Kaarina. He was a Member of the Parliament of Finland, representing the Social Democratic Party of Finland (SDP) from 1930 to 1958, the Social Democratic Opposition from 1958 to 1959 and the Social Democratic Union of Workers and Smallholders (TPSL) from 1959 to 1962.

References

1889 births
1964 deaths
People from Kaarina
People from Turku and Pori Province (Grand Duchy of Finland)
Social Democratic Party of Finland politicians
Social Democratic Union of Workers and Smallholders politicians
Members of the Parliament of Finland (1930–33)
Members of the Parliament of Finland (1933–36)
Members of the Parliament of Finland (1936–39)
Members of the Parliament of Finland (1939–45)
Members of the Parliament of Finland (1945–48)
Members of the Parliament of Finland (1948–51)
Members of the Parliament of Finland (1951–54)
Members of the Parliament of Finland (1954–58)
Members of the Parliament of Finland (1958–62)
Finnish people of World War II